John Thompson (born March 5, 1989) is an American junior middleweight professional boxer.

2015 Boxcino tournament
Thompson won the 2015 Boxcino tournament - a tournament featured exclusively on ESPN Friday Night Fights.  At the finals of this tournament he also won the interim North American Boxing Association and WBO Inter-Continental junior middleweight titles.

WBO world title fight
The Boxcino win increased Thompson's ranking in the WBO.  When the WBO title was stripped from Demetrius Andrade, Liam Smith was to fight Michel Soro for the vacant title.  Soro pulled out of the fight for the vacant title so Thompson was awarded the title shot by virtue of being the next highest available fighter.  The fight took place October 10, 2015 on the undercard of the Andy Lee-Billy Joe Saunders title fight, with Thompson losing by knockout.

References

External links

1989 births
Light-middleweight boxers
Living people
American male boxers
African-American boxers
Boxers from Newark, New Jersey
21st-century African-American sportspeople
20th-century African-American people